The 2017 West Sussex County Council election took place as part of the 2017 local elections in the UK. All councillors were elected for single-member electoral divisions for a four-year term.  The voting system used was first-past-the-post.

Boundary changes to the electoral divisions took effect following a review by the Local Government Boundary Commission for England.

The result was Conservative councillors formed an increased, 20-seat, majority on the council at the loss of the ten UKIP seats.  The second-largest party grouping of councillors remained Liberal Democrats, gaining one seat to have nine seats and the balance of the council was formed by five Labour Party councillors, having lost one seat, net.

Results summary

|}

Results by electoral division
West Sussex is composed of 7 districts: Adur District, Arun District, Chichester District, Crawley Borough, Horsham District, Mid Sussex District and Worthing Borough.  The following results are grouped by district.

Adur

Arun

Chichester

Crawley

Horsham

Mid Sussex

Worthing

References

2017
2017 English local elections
2010s in West Sussex